The Sufferer & The Witness Tour was a concert tour by punk band Rise Against, that took from 2006 until 2007, in support of their second major label album (fourth overall), The Sufferer & The Witness.

The tour began with the band headlining the 2006 Vans Warped Tour in the summer, a few weeks before the release of the album. The band then embarked on a short European summer leg, with A Wilhelm Scream and Berri Txarrak supporting. The band then returned for a full-scale North American tour with co-headliners Circa Survive, Billy Talent and Thursday though Billy Talent were forced to cancel the first 5 dates and were replaced by Evergreen Terrace. This followed a short Australian tour, followed by another North American leg, which consisted of a Canadian tour, co-headlined by Billy Talent, Anti-Flag and Moneen and the rest were US dates, where the band supported My Chemical Romance. The band then returned for another European leg, supported by Cancer Bats and The Bronx.

Upon returning to the States, the band co-headlined a summer tour with Silverstein and Comeback Kid, with various guest supporting acts, including 2Cents, Smoke or Fire, Sum 41 (1 date), Pennywise and Strung Out (1 date), and Holy Roman Empire, whose singer Emily Schambra contributed vocals to the band's album.

The band then co-headlined the Taste of Chaos 2007 International Edition Tour, in Australia, Japan and Europe. The band performed a shorter than usual set, with co-headliners The Used, Aiden and Gallows, with Drop Dead, Gorgeous and The Bled (in Japan only) and The Blackout (in Europe only). The band finished the tour with a few US special Christmas shows, like the KROQ Almost Acoustic Christmas special.

Set list

Tour dates

Personnel
Tim McIlrath – lead vocals, rhythm guitar
Joe Principe – bass, backing vocals
Zach Blair – lead guitar, backing vocals (2007)
Chris Chasse – lead guitar, backing vocals (2006–2007)
Brandon Barnes – drums, percussion

Support acts

 2Cents (July 2–7, 10–14, 2007)
 A Wilhelm Scream (August 28–30, 2006; September 1, 4–13, 2006)
 Airway (November 16, 2007)
 Anti-Flag (January 18–February 8, 2007)
 Antagonist (October 28, 2007)
 Berri Txarrak (August 28–30, 2006; September 1, 6–13, 2006)
 Break Even (December 5, 2006)
 Callista (October 28, 2007)
 Campus (November 9, 2007)
 Cancer Bats (April 10–May 12, 2007)
 Carpathian (October 19–26, 2007)
 Circa Survive (October 23–November 22, 2006)
 Comeback Kid (June 15–27, 2007; July 2–September 15, 2007)
 Cyanide City (October 28, 2007)
 Death by Stereo (January 17, 2007)
 Drop Dead, Gorgeous (October 19–28, 2007; November 1–4, 2007)
 Evergreen Terrace (October 23–28, 2006)
 False Start (October 28, 2007)
 Gallows (October 19–28, 2007; November 1–4, 2007; November 7–28, 2007)

 God So Loved the World (December 1, 2006)
 Holy Roman Empire (June 15, 2007; July 16–29, 2007; September 19, 2007)
 Lagwagon (September 15, 2007)
 Miles Away (December 5, 2006)
 Moneen (January 18–February 8, 2007)
 Not Advised (November 19, 2007)
 Planes Mistaken for Stars (January 17, 2007)
 Pro Team (December 1, 2006)
 Silverstein (June 15–27, 2007; July 2–September 19, 2007)
 Smoke or Fire (August 16–30, 2007)
 Strung Out (September 15, 2007)
 Sum 41 (September 13, 2007)
 Taking Back Sunday (March 16, 2007)
 The Blackout (November 7–28, 2007)
 The Bled (October 19–28, 2007; November 1–4, 2007)
 The Bronx (April 10–May 12, 2007)
 Thursday (October 23–November 22, 2006)
 Underoath (March 16, 2007)
 We Are the Ocean (November 28, 2007)

Co-headlining
 Billy Talent (October 30–November 22, 2006; January 18–February 8, 2007)
 The Used (October 19–28, 2007; November 1–4, 2007; November 7–28, 2007)
 Aiden (October 19–28, 2007; November 1–4, 2007; November 7–28, 2007)

As a supporting act
 My Chemical Romance (February 22–March 16, 2007)

Songs played

From The Unraveling
Alive and Well

From Revolutions per Minute
Black Masks and Gasoline
Heaven Knows
Like the Angel
Any Way You Want It (Journey cover)

From Siren Song of the Counter Culture
State of the Union
Life Less Frightening
Paper Wings
Blood to Bleed
Tip the Scales
Anywhere But Here
Give It All
Dancing for Rain
Swing Life Away

From The Sufferer & the Witness
Chamber the Cartridge
Injection
Ready to Fall
Bricks
Under the Knife
Prayer of the Refugee
Drones
Behind Closed Doors
Roadside
The Good Left Undone
Survive

Others
Ohio (Crosby, Stills, Nash & Young cover)
Tour Song (Jawbreaker cover)

References

2006 concert tours
2007 concert tours
Rise Against concert tours